Stars Underground is an American rock band that started in early '90s Hollywood glam punk scene,. Using the name Never On Sunday with vocalists Sharmet & Roxy Saint. They call Hollywood, California, and Boston, Massachusetts, home.

Zombie Strippers

In 2008 former lead singer Roxy Saint would have a major acting role in the horror movie 'Zombie Strippers.'
The movie would star A Nightmare on Elm Street's Robert Englund (Freddy Krueger), and Jenna Jameson.

Notes

External links

Stars Underground - Soundtrack to a Suicide on CDBaby
Stars Underground on Rockeyze
Stars Underground on Glitzine
Stars Underground on Friendly Fire Radio (Episode #23 - 6/24/2005)
Bang's website
Roxy Saints website
Zombie Strippers website

Rock music groups from California
Rock music groups from Massachusetts